The Raid on Buena Noche was a raid during the Mexican Revolution where supporters of the American soldier of fortune Emil Lewis Holmdahl, raided the Buena Noche Mine, near Rosario.

Raid

Holmdahl esblished a stronghold deep in the mountains following his defeat at Tepic, and only a few weeks later he began making preparations to raid the Buena Noche Mine near Rosario, where he hoped to steal enough dynamite to start a bomb factory from where he could launch an attack upon Rosario itself. 

With a band of 22 men Holmdahl raided the mine, where he stole 27 cases of dynamite.

Aftermath

Holmdahl started a bomb factory at his mountain hideout, and when enough were constructed he was ready to attack Rosario alongside Martin Epsinosa.

References

Sources

Meed, Douglas (2003). Soldier of Fortune: Adventuring in Latin America and Mexico with Emil Lewis Holmdahl. Houston, Texas: Halycon Press Ltd
History of Nayarit (2019)
Mountjoy, Joseph B. (2013). "Aztatlan Complex". In Evans, Susan T.; Webster, David L. (eds.). Archaeology of Ancient Mexico and Central America: An Encyclopedia. Routledge
Taylor, Laurence D (1999) "The Magonista Revolt in Baja California". The Journal of San Diego History.

February 1911 events
1911 in Mexico
Mexican Revolution
Battles of the Mexican Revolution